Völkerwiesenbach is a river of Rhineland-Palatinate, Germany. It springs northeast of Bonefeld. On its course, it traverses the artificial lake of the Obere Mühle in Rengsdorf.  It is a right tributary of the Engelsbach at the eastern outskirts of Rengsdorf.

In 1926 an outdoor swimming pool was opened using the water of the Völkerwiesenbach, supported by Fritz Henkel, the founder of Henkel. In 1966, it was replaced by a new one, located above the old one.

See also
List of rivers of Rhineland-Palatinate

References 

Rivers of Rhineland-Palatinate
Rivers of the Westerwald
Rivers of Germany